The Minnesota Senate, District 8, includes portions of Douglas and Otter Tail counties in the west central part of the state. It is currently represented by Republican Bill Ingebrigtsen.

List of senators

References 

Minnesota Senate districts
Grant County, Minnesota
Otter Tail County, Minnesota
Stevens County, Minnesota
Todd County, Minnesota